The 1926 World Table Tennis Championships mixed doubles was the inaugural edition of the mixed doubles championship.  

Zoltán Mechlovits and Mária Mednyánszky defeated Roland Jacobi and Linda Gleeson in the final by two sets to nil.

Results

See also
List of World Table Tennis Championships medalists

References

-